The main mission of the Cyprus Civil Defence Force  is carrying out various humanitarian projects intended to protect the civilian population and to help it recover from the immediate effects of hostilities or disasters, as well as to provide the conditions necessary for its survival.

History
During the establishment of the Republic of Cyprus, there was no organized Civil Defence on the island. Immediately after the Turkish bombings of Tilliria in 1964, the need to create an organized Civil Defence was evident. Thus with the passage of the Law of 1964 by the House of Representatives, a provision was made for the organisation of political forces and defense services, either on voluntary or compulsory basis, the training of citizens in the Civil Defence, on the procurement and storage of supplies and on the construction of shelters. Provisions were also made for requisitioning, purchase and lease of movable or immovable property. According to the provisions of the Act, the Council of Ministers adopted a regulation passed by the House in 1986 and were subsequently amended with the basis on which the Civil Defense Force was established.

The Law on Civil Defence amended and consolidated in 1996 and then voted on the new Civil Defence (General) Regulations 1997 to strengthen and reorganize the whole system of Civil Defense of the Republic.

See also
Cyprus Defense forces related topics:
Cypriot National Guard
Cyprus Air Forces
Cyprus Fire Service
Cyprus Joint Rescue Coordination Center
Cyprus Navy
Cyprus Police
Cyprus Port & Marine Police

Civil Defence related topics:
 Blast shelter
 Civil-defense Geiger counters
 Civil defense siren
 Effects of nuclear explosions on human health
 Emergency management
 Fallout shelter
 Nuclear warfare
 Survivalism
 Transarmament
 Weapon of mass destruction
 Civil defense by nation

References

External links
http://www.moi.gov.cy/cd
http://www.icdo.org/index.php?option=com_content&view=article&id=24&Itemid=28&lang=ar
https://web.archive.org/web/20120330083750/http://www.civpro-gr.eu/page/CyprusCivilDefence(CY)
https://web.archive.org/web/20110316052614/http://www.e-self-help.eu/index.php?id=info0
http://www.cyprus.gov.cy/portal/portal.nsf/All/67BC27CB267239AAC22570140051AC9A?OpenDocument
http://www.mod.gov.cy/mod/cjrcc.nsf/index_en/index_en?OpenDocument

Emergency services in Cyprus